The following elections occurred in the year 1909.

Asia
 1909 Persian legislative election
 1909 Philippine Assembly elections

Europe
 1909 Danish Folketing election
 1909 Dutch general election
 1909 Finnish parliamentary election
 1909 Norwegian parliamentary election

North America

Canada
 1909 Alberta general election
 1909 British Columbia general election
 1909 Edmonton municipal election
 1909 Newfoundland general election
 1909 Toronto municipal election
 1909 Yukon general election

United States
 United States Senate election in New York, 1909

Oceania

Australia
 1909 Bulloo state by-election
 1909 Moreton state by-election
 1909 Tasmanian state election

New Zealand
 1909 Rangitikei by-election
 1909 Thames by-election

1909
1909 elections
Elections